Myosotis mooreana is a synonym of Myosotis australis, a species of forget-me-not native to the southern South Island of New Zealand. The species was described by Carlos Lehnebach in 2012.

Description 
Myosotis mooreana forms loose rosettes with erect flowering stems. Flowers are white with included anthers.

Distribution 
The species has a very restricted distribution, known only from certain sites in Kahurangi National Park in the northern South Island, New Zealand.

Conservation Status 
The species is listed as Nationally Critical on the most recent New Zealand Threat Classification for plants. It also has the qualifiers  "DP" (Data Poor), "OL" (One Location) and "Sp" (Sparse).

References

External links 

 Myosotis mooreana occurrence data from Australasian Virtual Herbarium

Endangered flora of New Zealand
Myosotis